Ashraf Jehan Jamali (born 9 February 1957) is a Pakistani judge. After graduating from Jinnah Law College, Hyderabad, Pakistan in 1983 she joined the judicial service as Civil Judge and First Class Magistrate in 1987 and was promoted as District & Sessions Judge Karachi (East) in 2003. In 2012 she was appointed as additional judge of the Sindh High Court, and in 2013/14 she was appointed the first female judge of the Federal Shariat Court. She is the wife of 24th Chief Justice of Pakistan, Justice Anwar Zaheer Jamali.

References 

Living people
Place of birth missing (living people)
Pakistani women judges
1957 births